Abraham Schadaeus (1566 – 10 October 1626) was a German music editor, best known for a three-part anthology of choral music he compiled under the title Promptuarium musicum.

References

German male musicians
1566 births
1626 deaths